Goshaku Somegoro (ja:五尺染五郎) is a fictional hero made popular in Japanese kabuki theatre in the play Koi moyô furisode myoto (ja: 恋模様振袖妹背).

Plays
 Shochikubai
 Ume no haru gojusan tsugi

External links
 Kabuki plays

Kabuki_characters
Male characters in theatre